Solanum ptychanthum, the West Indian nightshade or eastern black nightshade, is an annual or occasionally perennial plant in the Solanaceae (Nightshade) family.  It is typically 15–60 cm tall and many branched.

The leaves of eastern black nightshade are triangular to elliptic.  The stems are circular, and sometimes slightly hairy.  The flowers are small, white, and star-shaped, and they occur in small umbels of 5-7.  The flowers ripen into glossy, black berries, each 10 mm in diameter and containing between 50 and 100 seeds. The ripened fruits have been shown to be not poisonous in low to moderate amounts, however the unripened berries are toxic. The berries are eaten and dispersed by birds.

Nomenclature
The original spelling is ptychanthum, from the Ancient Greek words  "a fold" and  "flower".  Some sources mistakenly refer to this plant as S. ptycanthum (without the first h).

Some sources list Solanum americanum as a synonym, but it is a misapplication of the name.  The Germplasm Resources Information Network lists Solanum americanum as a synonym of S. ptychanthum, but as S. americanum auct. (i.e. a misapplication of the name), not S. americanum Mill.  Other sites have not make this distinction and the two have become confused.

Habitat
Eastern black nightshade is native to North America. It grows in landscapes and mixed in among most crops.  It is most likely to be found growing near crops of related species such as tomatoes and potatoes.  It can grow on sandy and poor soil, but prefers fertile and cultivated soil types. Eastern black nightshade is found in all but the most Western U.S. states (i.e. Washington, Oregon, Nevada, California), as well as in the southern provinces of Canada from Alberta to the Maritimes. It is introduced in Alaska, Hawaii, and the Virgin Islands.

As a weed
Eastern black nightshade is not a strong competitor with most crops.  It is, however, shade tolerant and so an infestation can survive and continue to grow even in the shade of crop plants.  There are no easy chemical methods for controlling Eastern black nightshade, but night tillage reduces emergence by 50% to 75%.  Planting soybeans in 7.5-inch rows also reduces growth significantly, and is the recommended method of control.

References

Footnotes
 Richard H. Uva, Joseph C. Neal and Joseph M. Ditomaso, Weeds of The Northeast, (Ithaca, NY: Cornell University Press, 1997), pp. 318–319.
 A. Davis, K. Renner, C. Sprague, L. Dyer, D. Mutch (2005). Integrated Weed Management. MSU.

External links

ptychanthum
Flora of North America